Yi Am (in Hangul:이암, in Hanja:李巖, 1499–?) was a painter during the early- to mid-Joseon Dynasty. He was the grandson of the fourth son of Sejong the Great.

His paintings are famous for exhibiting the artist's own style, it is distinct from the Chinese style of the Song dynasty. Yi Am created many portraits, including the portrait of King Jungjong of Joseon.

Several museums in South Korea have housed his paintings. His paintings portray animals in a creative manner, which has influenced later artists such as Kim Sik (1579–1662) and Byeon Sang-byeok (18th century). It is said that Yi Am drew flowers, animals and small insects by the method of maximizing his observation.

See also
An Gyeon
Jeong Seon
Gim Hongdo

References

External links
Arts of Korea, an exhibition catalog from The Metropolitan Museum of Art Libraries (fully available online as PDF), which contains material on Yi Am

1499 births
16th-century Korean painters
Year of death unknown